Stomopteryx calligoni is a moth of the family Gelechiidae. It was described by Piskunov in 1982. It is found in Mongolia.

References

Moths described in 1982
Stomopteryx